Duncan Dowson  (31 August 1928 – 6 January 2020) was a British engineer and Professor of Engineering Fluid Mechanics and Tribology at the University of Leeds.

Biography
Dowson's father, Wilfrid Dowson, was an ornamental blacksmith, and as a child his son helped him in his work. Dowson himself was educated at Lady Lumley's Grammar School and studied mechanical engineering at the University of Leeds, from which he held the degrees of BSc, PhD and DSc.

Academic career
After completing his PhD in 1952, Dowson worked as a Research Engineer at Sir W G Armstrong Whitworth Aircraft Company.  He returned to the Department of Mechanical Engineering at Leeds as a Lecturer in 1954, ultimately becoming Professor of Engineering Fluid Mechanics and Tribology there.

He was best known for his work on elastohydrodynamic lubrication. In 1974, he received the International Award from the Society of Tribologists and Lubrication Engineers. In 1979, he was awarded the Tribology Gold Medal by the Institution of Mechanical Engineers and the Mayo D. Hersey Award from the American Society of Mechanical Engineers.

Dowson was Head of the Department of Mechanical Engineering at Leeds from 1987 to 1992 and director of the Institute of Tribology there from 1967 to 1986.  He was also Pro-Vice-Chancellor at Leeds from 1983 to 1985.  He retired in 1993 with the title Emeritus Professor.

Dowson was President of the Institution of Mechanical Engineers in 1992.
The Duncan Dowson prize is named in his honour.

In 2016, he presented the Higginson Lecture in Durham University.

Honours

Dowson was elected a Fellow of the Royal Society (FRS) in 1987. He was made a Commander of the Most Excellent Order of the British Empire (CBE) in 1989. He was elected a Fellow for the Royal Academy of Engineering (FREng) in 1982.

Dowson received the following honorary degrees:

 DSc - Chalmers University of Technology - 1979
 Docteur - INSA Lyon - 1991
 DSc - University of Liège - 1995
 DEng - University of Waterloo - 2001
 DEng - University of Bradford - 2002
 DEng - University of Leeds - 2003
 DSc - Loughborough University - 2005

Works
Duncan Dowson, Gordon Robert Higginson, Elastohydrodynamic Lubrication J. F. Archand, 1966; 2 edn, 1977
 History of Tribology Longman, 1979, ; Wiley, 1998, 
 Biomechanics of Joints and Joint Replacements (1981)
 Ball Bearing Lubrication (1981)
Advances in medical tribology, Mechanical Engineering Publications, 1998,

References

External links
 http://www.engin.cf.ac.uk/whoswho/profile.asp?RecordNo=526
 http://www.biotribologyconference.com/bio_dowson.asp
 http://frettingwear.com/2010/duncan-dowson/
 

1928 births
2020 deaths
20th-century British engineers
British mechanical engineers
Tribologists
Alumni of the University of Leeds
Academics of the University of Leeds
Fellows of the Royal Academy of Engineering
Fellows of the Royal Society
Commanders of the Order of the British Empire